Carboxydothermus siderophilus is a thermophilic and anaerobic bacterium from the genus of Carboxydothermus which has been isolated from a hot spring in Kamchatka in Russia.

References

 

Peptococcaceae
Bacteria described in 2009
Thermophiles